John Pleshette (born July 27, 1942) is an American actor and screenwriter, best known for his role as Richard Avery on the television drama Knots Landing, and for portraying Lee Harvey Oswald in the TV movie The Trial of Lee Harvey Oswald. Pleshette also wrote several scripts for Knots Landing in the 1980s.

Career
In a television acting career spanning decades, Pleshette has appeared in such shows as The Rockford Files; Highway to Heaven; Kojak; Magnum P.I.; Simon & Simon; Murder, She Wrote; MacGyver; Beauty and the Beast; L.A. Law; The Larry Sanders Show; Dr. Quinn, Medicine Woman; ER; NYPD Blue; The Sopranos; Law & Order: LA, and Curb Your Enthusiasm.

Pleshette played Lee Harvey Oswald in the television film The Trial of Lee Harvey Oswald (1977), and appeared in the TV miniseries Seventh Avenue the same year. In 1979, he was cast in the role of Richard Avery on Knots Landing. Series creator David Jacobs was acquainted with Pleshette's work, and Pleshette was married to literary agent Lynn Pleshette, Jacobs' ex-wife. Pleshette appeared on Knots Landing for four seasons (1979–83), and returned briefly in 1987. During the 1980s, he wrote several scripts for the series.

Pleshette also appeared in the Blake Edwards comedy S.O.B. (1981), and Micki & Maude (1984). He appeared in the episode 'The Judas Bug" of the ABC crime drama The Feather and Father Gang in 1977, and in MacGyver in the Season Two episode "D.O.A.: MacGyver".

Personal life

Pleshette and wife, Lynn, have a daughter, Sophie. He is a cousin of the late actress Suzanne Pleshette. He was graduated from Brown University in 1964.

Filmography

Film

Television

References

External links

1942 births
20th-century American male actors
21st-century American male actors
American male film actors
American male television actors
Brown University alumni
Living people
Male actors from New York City